Cyanea mannii is a rare species of flowering plant in the bellflower family known by the common name Mann's cyanea. It is endemic to Hawaii, where it is known only from the island of Molokai. There are 9 occurrences with fewer than 3000 plants remaining. It is a federally listed endangered species. Like other Cyanea it is known as haha in Hawaiian.

This Hawaiian lobelioid is a shrub growing 1.5 to 3 meters tall with a palmlike cluster of leaves at the top of the stem. The inflorescence produces purple flowers. The plant grows in moist forest habitat. Threats to the species include degradation of this habitat by feral pigs and rodents.

References

External links
USDA Plants Profile

mannii
Endemic flora of Hawaii
Biota of Molokai